The XRB class are a class of cabless diesel locomotives built by Pacific National in 2005–2006.

History
The XRB class were built by Pacific National at their South Dynon workshops. They are mechanically similar to XR class locomotives, but are B units without driving cabs. XRB locomotives are designed to be used as booster units on standard gauge interstate freight trains, and must be led by a locomotive with a conventional driving cab. The units do not have hostler controls for moving them around yards and depots, only being fitted with a dead engine device and park-brake button. All three class members are currently stored at the Port Augusta Workshops.

Status table

References

Co-Co locomotives
Locomotives with cabless variants
Pacific National diesel locomotives
Railway locomotives introduced in 2005
Standard gauge locomotives of Australia
Diesel-electric locomotives of Australia